The 2021 Tour of Belgium (known as the 2021 Baloise Belgium Tour for sponsorship purposes) was the 90th edition of the Tour of Belgium road cycling stage race, which took place from 9 to 13 June 2021. The category 2.Pro event formed a part of the 2021 UCI Europe Tour and the 2021 UCI ProSeries. After being upgraded from a category 2.HC event after the 2019 season, the race was set to feature in the inaugural edition of the UCI ProSeries, but after the cancellation of the 2020 edition, this edition was its UCI ProSeries debut.

Teams 
Eight of the nineteen UCI WorldTeams, nine UCI ProTeams, and four UCI Continental teams made up the twenty-one teams that participated in the race.  UCI WorldTeam  were originally invited, but they withdrew due to a COVID-19 outbreak among their staff members. , with six riders, was the only team to not field a full squad of seven riders. Of the 146 riders who started the race, 137 finished.

UCI WorldTeams

 
 
 
  (Withdrawn)
 
 
 
 
 

UCI ProTeams

 
 
 
 
 
 
 
 
 

UCI Continental Teams

Route

Stages

Stage 1 
9 June 2021 — Beveren to Maarkedal,

Stage 2 
10 June 2021 — Knokke-Heist to Knokke-Heist,  (ITT)

Stage 3 
11 June 2021 — Gingelom to Scherpenheuvel-Zichem,

Stage 4 
12 June 2021 — Hamoir to Hamoir,

Stage 5 
13 June 2021 — Turnhout to Beringen,

Classification leadership table 

 On stage 2, Jan-Willem van Schip, who was second in the combativity classification, wore the white jersey, because first placed Robbe Ghys wore the red jersey as the leader of the points classification.
 On stage 3, Gianni Marchand, who was third in the points classification, wore the red jersey, because first placed Remco Evenepoel wore the blue jersey as the leader of the general classification and second placed Robbe Ghys wore the white jersey as the leader of the combativity classification.
 After stage 3, Jan-Willem van Schip, who led the combativity classification, was disqualified by the UCI's technical committee for having a handlebar set-up in contravention of UCI technical regulations, overruling an early decision by commissaires that allowed van Schip to use such handlebars. As a result, on stage 4, Cédric Beullens, who is second in that classification, will wear the white jersey.
 On stage 4, Robbe Ghys, who was second in the points classification, wore the red jersey, because first placed Remco Evenepoel wore the blue jersey as the leader of the general classification.

Final classification standings

General classification

Points classification

Combativity classification

Team classification

References

External links 
 

2021
Tour of Belgium
Tour of Belgium
Tour of Belgium
Tour of Belgium